The 2014 Ironman 70.3 World Championship was a triathlon competition that was held in Mont-Tremblant, Quebec, Canada on September 7, 2014 and won by Javier Gomez of Spain and Daniela Ryf of Switzerland. The championship was organized by the World Triathlon Corporation (WTC) and was the culmination of the Ironman 70.3 series of events that occurred from August 16, 2013 through July 27, 2014. Athletes, both professional and amateur, earned a spot in the championship race by qualifying in races throughout the 70.3 series. A prize purse of $250,000 was distributed to the top 10 male and female professional athletes, a $50,000 increase from the previous year.

This was the first year of the championship event being held in a non-recurring location. Previously, the last eight annual races had been held in only two locations, the Las Vegas area for the prior three races, and Clearwater, Florida before that. In 2014, the championship race began changing locations each year.

Championship results

Men

Women

Qualification
The 2014 Ironman 70.3 Series featured 59 events that enabled qualification to the 2014 World Championship event. Professional triathletes qualified for the championship race by competing in races during the qualifying period, earning points towards their pro rankings. An athlete's five highest scoring races were counted toward their pro rankings. The top 50 males and top 35 females in the pro rankings qualified for the championship race. The previous five 70.3 champions, as well as last year's Ironman World Champions and Hy-Vee Triathlon winners received an automatic qualifying spot. Professional athletes were also eligible for prize purses at each qualifying event, which ranged in total size from $15,000 to $250,000.

Amateur triathletes could qualify for the championship race by earning a qualifying slot at one of the qualifying events. At qualifying events, slots were allocated to each age group category, male and female, with the number of slots given out based on that category's proportional representation of the overall field. Each age group category was tentatively allocated one qualifying spot in each qualifying event. Some 70.3 events also served as qualifiers for the full Ironman World Championships in Hawaii. However, the 2014 qualifying year would be the final year for the current five, non-hand cycle, qualifying races in this capacity. This was to accommodate for the increased number of qualifying slots created from the newly added full Ironman events.

Qualifying Ironman 70.3 events

†
‡

The Ironman 70.3 Berlin race, scheduled to take place on July 13, 2014, was canceled on April 30, 2014. Ironman cited that the race licensee, SCC Events, was unable to get the city of Berlin to approve a bike course route.

Qualifying pro men
Qualifying slots into the championship race were awarded to the top 50 men in points. Slots that were not accepted by an athlete were rolled down to the next highest eligible qualifier in points.

Qualifying pro women
Qualifying slots were awarded to the top 35 women in points. Slots that were not accepted by an athlete were rolled down to the next highest eligible qualifier in points.

References

External links
Ironman 70.3 Series website

Ironman World Championship
Ironman
Ironman 70.3
Triathlon competitions in Canada